The 1897–98 St Helens R.F.C. season was the club's third in the Northern Rugby Football Union, the 24th in their history. The club finished 8th out of 14 in an improved performance from the previous year in the Lancashire League. In the Challenge Cup, St Helens were knocked out in the first round by last years final opponents Batley.

Lancashire Senior Championship

Source: R.L.Yearbook 1995-96 cited in "The Vault".

League points: for win = 2; for draw = 1; for loss = 0.
Pld = Games played; W = Wins; D = Draws; L = Losses; PF = Match points scored; PA = Match points conceded; PD = Points difference; Pts = League points.
Notes

References

St Helens R.F.C. seasons
St Helens RLFC season
St Helens RLFC season